King Agrippa may refer to:

 Agrippa (mythology), semi-mythological king of Alba Longa
 Herod Agrippa I, who killed James the son of Zebedee and imprisoned Peter
 Herod Agrippa II, who listened to Paul's defense

See also
 Agrippa (disambiguation)